Staurocumites is an extinct genus of sea cucumbers which existed in Europe during the Triassic and Jurassic periods. The type species is Staurocumites bartensteini.

References

Priscopedatidae
Prehistoric sea cucumber genera
Triassic first appearances
Jurassic extinctions